This is a list of capital cities of Nepal and its current and former provinces, and territories.

National capital

Regional

Current capitals

Former capitals

References 

 
Nepal
Capitals
Nepal